The Oakville Rock are Senior "A" box lacrosse team from Oakville, Ontario. They play in the Major Series Lacrosse league where under the current format, they compete in 20 regular season games (10 at home) from May through July and playoffs beginning in August and ending with the Mann Cup in September. The Rock play their home games at the Toronto Rock Athletic Centre in Oakville.

History
Formerly the Ajax-Pickering Rock¸ the team began competition in 2003 in the Senior "B" loop. Within 3 years of their founding, the Ajax Rock finished first in the OLA Senior "B" League and reached the finals against the Owen Sound Woodsmen. In 2009 the Rock were promoted to the Senior "A" loop and would compete in the 2010 season.

The Rock's first MSL game was at home against the Brooklin Redmen on Sunday May 30, 2010. They would end up losing their first game their first game 11-7 with Defenseman Brandon Turner scoring their first goal 44 seconds into the first period.  Their first win would come on Monday June 21 in Brooklin, winning 10-7. They would finish the 2010 campaign with a 3-13-0 record and would be swept by the Six Nations Chiefs in the first round of the playoffs.

In 2013, owner Rob Roche sought approval for the team to relocate from Ajax to Oakville sighting tiny crowds and a lack of competitiveness as key reasons for being unable to secure bigger talent to the club. Moving to the newly constructed Toronto Rock Athletic Centre and adding Toronto Rock GM Terry Sanderson seemed to be a logical choice. MSL and the OLA approved the move and the team relocated West of Toronto.

Season-by-Season results

See also
Major Series Lacrosse
OLA Senior B Lacrosse League

References

Lacrosse teams in Ontario
Oakville, Ontario